Chumael is a village in the Bafatá Region of southern-central Guinea-Bissau. It lies to the northeast of Mampata and the Corubal River.

References

Populated places in Guinea-Bissau
Bafatá Region